Voorburg is a town and former municipality in the west part of the province of South Holland, Netherlands. Together with Leidschendam and Stompwijk, it makes up the municipality Leidschendam-Voorburg. It has a population of about 39,000 people. It is considered to be the oldest city in The Netherlands and celebrated its 2000th year of existence in 1988. However in Holland the status of 'city' normally commenced with the bestowing of a 'city charter' by its sovereign leader(s) and none available is that old.  
Human occupation has certainly been established as occurring two millennia ago, where Voorburg is located now. 
In 2002, the cities of Leidschendam and Voorburg were merged under the new municipality named "Leidschendam-Voorburg". Situated adjacent to the city of The Hague, it is often regarded as one of its suburbs.

History

Voorburg, the most densely populated of the three towns in the municipality, has its roots in the 2nd century, when a local civilian settlement gained city rights from the Romans, becoming known as Forum Hadriani. It was along the Fossa Corbulonis, a canal connecting the Rhine and the Meuse that had been dug in 47 AD by the Roman general Corbulo. This waterway is now known as the Rijn-Schie canal (more commonly referred to as the Vliet) and is still a dominant landmark of the present day borough.

Famous inhabitants of Voorburg include the 17th century author and poet Constantijn Huygens, who spent many years building his small country house Hofwijck with adjacent geometrically shaped gardens alongside the Vliet. His son, the famous astronomer and mathematician Christiaan Huygens, spent several years in his father's country house in Voorburg. The house, located next to the main railway station, now functions as a museum.

Philosopher Baruch Spinoza lived in Voorburg from 1663 to 1670. In Voorburg, Spinoza continued work on the Ethics and corresponded with scientists, philosophers, and theologians throughout Europe. He also wrote and published his Theological Political Treatise in 1670, in defense of secular and constitutional government, and in support of Johan de Witt, the Grand Pensionary of the Netherlands, against the Stadtholder, the Prince of Orange. He equated God with Nature. 

Until 2009 Voorburg hosted the major branch of the country's statistics institute, the CBS (Central Bureau for Statistics), which provides most of the statistical data used by the government. That year the CBS relocated a few kilometers eastward to Leidschenveen, one of the new developments around the city of The Hague

Until June 2006 the town had three railway stations: Voorburg, Voorburg 't Loo and Leidschendam-Voorburg station. The latter two are now part of the Randstad Rail network. Voorburg used to be an Intercity station, because there was an eternal agreement with the railways that every passing train should stop there. It lost that status, as the new railway station is elevated and therefore no longer on the soil of Voorburg.

Voorburg Cricket Club (VCC) Sportpark Westvliet, The Hague Cricket ground
Voorburg Cricket Club (VCC) Sportpark Westvliet cricket ground was approved by the ICC as the Netherlands' latest ODI venue. It joins the VRA ground in Amstelveen and the Hazelaarweg ground in Rotterdam in gaining ODI status. Bangladesh played one Twenty20 International match each against Scotland and Netherlands there in July 2012.

Notable people from Voorburg
 
Johan de Meij, conductor, trombonist, and composer
Eljero Elia, Dutch footballer
Marcellus Emants, author
Guillaume Groen van Prinsterer, politician and historian
Bart Groothuis, politician
Ehsan Jami, politician and activist
, radio and television presenter
Jerney Kaagman, singer
Gerben Karstens, former professional cyclist
, Dutch Champion Race Walking, re-inventor of Electro Culture in Agriculture
Karen Mulder, former model

Julian Thomas, singer-songwriter
Dylan van Baarle, cyclist
Daan van Bunge, cricketer
Harry Vanda, member of the Easybeats and Flash and the Pan
Pieter Winsemius, politician
Eefje de Visser, singer-songwriter

References

External links 
 
 Livius.org: Fossa Corbulonis (The Canal of Corbulo)

Municipalities of the Netherlands disestablished in 2002
Populated places in South Holland
Former municipalities of South Holland
Germania Inferior
Leidschendam-Voorburg